Susan Blond, is a New York publicist and the owner of entertainment and lifestyle publicity agency Susan Blond, Inc.

Growing up in New York City, Blond attended the High School of Music and Art (now known as Fiorello H. LaGuardia High School of Music & Art and Performing Arts) where she studied painting. She was given a one-person show at Harvard University (1971) while she attended school in Boston. She was later chosen to participate in the Whitney Museum's Independent Study Program in New York.

Blond returned home after college and was immediately drawn into the New York art world and Andy Warhol’s Factory. She and Warhol developed a strong friendship, with Warhol proclaiming that he would make her a star. Blond indeed went on to star in a number of Warhol's movies (including an infamous scene in Andy Warhol's Bad where she drops a baby out of a high-rise window), Phoneys (1973), as well as Madam Wangs, directed by filmmaker Paul Morrissey.

Soon after Warhol launched Interview magazine, he saw that he had tapped into a growing publishing niche under the editorial direction of writer Glenn O'Brien. Warhol appointed Blond to launch Interview's advertising arm.

Blond's first job in PR was with United Artists, where she represented artists such as Electric Light Orchestra, Tina Turner, and Shirley Bassey, soundtracks for Blaxploitation films such as Shaft, and film scores by Ennio Morricone for the spaghetti westerns directed by Sergio Leone.

Soon thereafter, Blond moved on to Epic Records, which was owned by CBS at the time. Blond became the first female Vice President of Press & Public Information, and worked on the press campaigns of popular artists including first albums from Ozzy Osbourne, Culture Club, Cyndi Lauper, Sade, Meat Loaf and Boston. Luther Vandross and The Clash (during their seminal London Calling album) also released albums on the label under her watch. She also worked with Michael Jackson during his Bad, Off the Wall and Thriller years.

After 13 years at Epic, Blond formed her own company, Susan Blond, Inc. in late 1986, where some of her first clients included the Tunnel nightclub in New York, music industry figures such as Charles Koppelman and musicians such as Julio Iglesias and George Jones.

Blond has been involved with a number of cause-related organizations, including DIFFA (where she serves as board secretary), and is a frequent speaker at many Jewish cultural events.

Blond was also the publicist for singer Morrissey, former member of The Smiths.

Movies
Mixed Blood (1984) as Caterer
Forty Deuce (1982) as Escort
Madame Wang's (1981) as Long Beach Party Giver
Andy Warhol's Bad (1977) as Baby-Killing Mother

Media
 P.R. maven Susan Blond rents out her Sagaponack beach home New York Post
Susan Blond Wins This Charming Man, Other Big Clients PR Newser
Susan Blond dishes about Michael Jackson, Prince and Andy Warhol Newsday
TOP THREE PARTIES: GOOD RESOURCES, IF LOOKS COULD KILT, DEPARTMENT OF THE INTERIOR Vanity Fair
PARTY LIKE A CANUCK Vanity Fair
New candidate for Amy's satire New York Daily News
 Wild Style New York Times

References

Living people
American public relations people
Businesspeople from New York City
1949 births